Ittibittium parcum is a species of sea snail, a marine gastropod mollusk in the family Cerithiidae.

Description

Distribution

References

 Hasegawa K. (2017). Family Cerithiidae. pp. 788–793, in: T. Okutani (ed.), Marine Mollusks in Japan, ed. 2. 2 vols. Tokai University Press. 1375 pp

External links
Gould, A. A. (1861). Description of new shells collected by the United States North Pacific Exploring Expedition. Proceedings of the Boston Society of Natural History. 7: 385–389

Cerithiidae
Gastropods described in 1861